The Fédération étudiante collégiale du Québec (FECQ) (in English : College students federation of Quebec) is a federation of college student unions, created in March 1990 after the failure of the 1989 strike (its first motto was «Plus jamais la grève!», in English: The strike, never again!). The FECQ mainly use lobbying with political parties to represent the students interests. At its peak, the FECQ claims to have represented 27 student associations and over 72,000 CÉGEP students - however, there is controversy about the actual number of members it has.

Notable figures from FECQ history

Léo Bureau-Blouin

See also
Fédération étudiante universitaire du Québec, its former university counterpart
Association pour une solidarité syndicale étudiante

References

Quebec students' associations
Students' associations in Canada
Groups of students' unions
Student political organizations
Organizations based in Montreal